Robert Wentworth Scott (born 24 July 1998) is a British cyclist, who currently rides for UCI Continental team .

Major results

2015
 1st Stage 3 Junior Tour of Wales
 2nd Road race, National Junior Road Championships
2016
 Isle of Man Junior Tour
1st Stages 1 (ITT) & 3
 1st Stage 1 (ITT) Junior Tour of Wales
2018
 National Under-23 Road Championships
1st  Road race
5th Time trial
 4th Road race, National Road Championships
2019
 4th Kattekoers
 9th Overall Le Triptyque des Monts et Châteaux
2021
 10th Ronde van de Achterhoek
2022
 1st  Overall Tour de la Mirabelle
1st Stage 3
 1st Paris–Troyes
 1st Manx International
 1st Lancaster GP

References

External links

1998 births
Living people
British male cyclists
English male cyclists